The Welcome Tour was a concert tour by Santana promoting their album, Welcome. The tour began on November 13, 1973 at Colston Hall in Bristol, England and ended on October 29, 1974 at the William P. Cole, Jr. Student Activities Building in College Park, Maryland.

History 
After releasing their new album Welcome on November 9, 1973, the band went on tour in North America and Europe to promote the release. The band started the tour with a European tour, starting on November 13, 1973 in England. The tour was scheduled to have two shows in Yugoslavia, but the band was denied entry into the country. Following the European tour, the band ended 1973 with a New Year's Eve show at the Winterland Ballroom in San Francisco. In 1974, the band started a North American tour. After finishing a short tour with British guitarist John McLaughlin, Carlos Santana assembled a new lineup of the band. The group added saxophonist Jules Broussard and singer/keyboardist Leon Patillo. Drummer Michael Shrieve left due to health problems and he ended up getting replaced by Leon "Ndugu" Chancler for a short period. Doug Rauch quit the band and David Brown, who had played with Santana from 1966 to 1971, followed in his footsteps.

The set lists of this tour were similar to the set lists of their previous tour, the difference being the addition of "Mirage" and "Give and Take", months before their release on Borboletta and the removal of certain songs from the last tour.

One of the largest crowds Santana performed to during this tour was an appearance at the World Series of Rock festival in Cleveland's Cleveland Stadium on August 31, before a crowd of around 88,000 people. Another large crowd Santana performed to was at the First Annual Barndance and Bar B. Q. in Austin, Texas, playing to a crowd of at least 80,000 people. The band sometimes opened for other artists during this tour such as Crosby, Stills, Nash & Young.

Reception 
A show on October 11, 1974 was given a positive review by Billboard.

Live releases 
Live material from this tour has appeared on the following releases:

 "Bambele" from December 31, 1973 at the Winterland Ballroom in San Francisco, California was released on the 1988 compilation album Viva Santana!.

Recordings 
No songs from 1974 have been officially released on an album. The concerts on July 28 and September 14 were broadcast on American radio, but only the July concert has surfaced.

Tour band 
 Leon Patillo – lead vocals, piano, organ
 Carlos Santana – electric guitar, Echoplex, Latin percussion, vocals
 Tom Coster – Yamaha organ, Hammond organ, electric piano, electric organ, vocals
 David Brown – bass guitar
 Jules Broussard – saxophone, flute
 Michael Shrieve – drums (through an unknown date)
 Leon "Ndugu" Chancler – drums (beginning on an unknown date)
 José ”Chepito” Areas – timbales, congas, percussion, vocals
 Armando Peraza – congas, percussion

Typical set lists

Tour dates

European leg (November 13 – December 12, 1973)

North American leg (December 31, 1973 – October 29, 1974)

Notes

Footnotes

References

External links 
 Santana Past Shows 1974 at Santana official website

Santana (band) concert tours
1974 concert tours
Concert tours of North America